The Tennessee State Guard (TNSG) is the state defense force of the state of Tennessee. The TNSG is organized as an all-volunteer military reserve force whose members drill once per month unless called to active duty. The TNSG is a branch of the Tennessee Military Department, alongside the Tennessee Army National Guard, the Tennessee Air National Guard, and the Tennessee Emergency Management Agency. The State Guard acts as a force multiplier for the state's National Guard. As a state defense force, the Tennessee State Guard cannot be federalized, and is not deployed outside the borders of Tennessee, as it is a purely state-level unit. It answers solely to the Governor of Tennessee, unlike the dual federal and state controlled National Guard. The creation of a state military force is recognized under Tennessee Code Annotated 58-1-401.

History

State militias
The Tennessee State Guard traces its origins to the American Revolution. During the Battle of King's Mountain, approximately four hundred volunteers from the area known today as Tennessee crossed the mountains into North Carolina to fight against the British Army and Loyalist militias. They contributed significantly to the Patriot victory.

Tennessee militias served in battle again in the War of 1812 under Andrew Jackson. After participating in the Battle of Horseshoe Bend, they served with distinction in the Battle of New Orleans, a major American victory in the conflict.

During the Mexican–American War, the nickname "The Volunteer State" became associated with Tennessee. When asked by President Polk to provide two infantry regiments and one cavalry regiment, Tennessee provided approximately ten times that number of volunteers.

During the Reconstruction Era, violent activity by the white supremacist Ku Klux Klan (KKK) and former Confederate partisans led Governor William G. Brownlow to establish the Tennessee State Guard as a state militia to counter these anti-Reconstruction efforts. The Tennessee State Guard was a coalition drawn from white Unionists and Radical Republicans, as well as black freedmen; seven companies contained black soldiers, including one commanded entirely by black officers. During the Reconstruction Era, the Tennessee State Guard was used "to police elections, protect recently enfranchised freedmen, and thwart the operations of paramilitary groups such as the Ku Klux Klan."

World War I
In 1915, to replace the Tennessee National Guard after the National Guard was federalized, Tennessee created a paramilitary unit, the Tennessee Rangers, which was organized as a constabulary unit and fell under the authority of the adjutant general. In 1916, the Rangers were deployed to end the burning and destruction of properties in Stewart County by the Ku Klux Klan. The Rangers helped maintain order during World War I while the National Guard was deployed abroad until their disbandment in 1923.

World War II
In 1941, prior to the United States' entrance into World War II, the Tennessee State Guard was reinstated by Governor Prentice Cooper. The State Guard received training and direction from the federal military, with approximately 100 officers spending two weeks training under army officers at Fort Oglethorpe in Georgia. Within a year, Tennessee's State Guard became the fifth largest in the United States, the largest in the South and the largest state guard in proportion to its population. One famous Tennessean, Alvin York, belonged to the World War II-era Tennessee State Guard, accepting a commission as a colonel in 1941. The State Guard was activated numerous times, including guarding a Boeing B-17 Flying Fortress which was forced to make an emergency landing outside of Pulaski, Tennessee; maintaining peace after a riot in Bristol, Tennessee; performing relief effort following a train crash in Jellico, Tennessee; and assisting in the pursuit and capture of three escaped German prisoners from Camp Forrest. By 1947, with National Guard units returning home, the State Guard went inactive.

1985-present
In 1985, the Tennessee Defense Force was reactivated to provide a trained military reserve force for the Governor to call upon in times of emergency, and, in 1998, the name was changed by the legislature to the Tennessee State Guard. In 1993, the TNSG was deployed to assist in recovery operations following a series of tornadoes which touched down in Tennessee. After the attacks of September 11, 2001, state guard members were called up to guard the Naval Support Activity Mid-South base in Millington, Tennessee. In 2004, during the Iraq War, members of the Tennessee State Guard were activated to assist the 278th Armored Cavalry Regiment with pre-mobilization processing. In 2005, Governor Phil Bredesen activated the Tennessee State Guard to assist with relief efforts from Hurricane Katrina.

In April 2020, members of the Tennessee State Guard were activated to State Active Duty in response to the COVID-19 pandemic. Members were tasked with providing medical support to Tennessee's COVID-19 Medical Joint Task Force. Soldiers of the Medical Expeditionary Group (MEG), composed of members of the 61st MEDCOM and other members of the TNSG, were honored in August 2021 by the Tennessee National Guard for their 17 months of State Active Duty service during the COVID pandemic. Over 110 TNSG soldiers participated in the response to support the people of Tennessee.

Duties

The organization's responsibilities are summarized in the mission statement of the Tennessee State Guard, namely: "The purpose of the Tennessee State Guard is to provide a professional complement of personnel to support the State mission of the Tennessee National Guard, by assisting the Tennessee Army National Guard as a force multiplier, and at the direction of the Adjutant General, to assist civil authorities with disaster relief, humanitarian causes, ceremonial service, religious and medical support for the well being and safety of the citizenry of Tennessee."

The Tennessee State Guard can be used to augment National Guard units in times of emergency, provide medical aid, security, funeral honors, high frequency (HF) communications and perform other stateside responsibilities generally performed by the Tennessee National Guard. The State Guard can serve as first responders to a natural or man-made disaster, and may integrate emergency response plans with local community emergency response teams. Aside from deploying to aid victims of Hurricane Katrina, and guarding military installations in the aftermath of the September 11 attacks, State Guardsmen, in preparing for their role as emergency response personnel, also participated in Operation Vigilant Guard in a disaster response drill organized as a mock earthquake disaster zone. Since the state guard is not a federal force, it is not prohibited from engaging in law enforcement by the Posse Comitatus Act, unlike federal military units. As the Tennessee State Guard generally provides non-combat support for the National Guard or state civilian authorities, guardsmen are not armed during duty, although no law exists which prevents them from being armed on the governor's orders.

Although the TNSG performs unarmed support roles during deployment, members of the TNSG regularly compete in the Mid-South Guard & Reserve Association M16 rifle and Beretta M9 pistol marksmanship competitions against Army, Navy, Air Force, Marine Corps, and Coast Guard reservists as well as members of the National Guard.

In 2014, at the request of the 194th Engineer Brigade of the Tennessee Army National Guard, several National Incident Management System (NIMS)-certified instructors from the 1st Regiment of the Tennessee State Guard provided NIMS training to members of the 194th Engineer Brigade over a two-day training period. The State Guard plans to continue providing emergency management training to National Guardsmen based in other cities.

In 2019, the 61st Medical Company (MEDCOM) participated in Operation Ardent/Shaken Fury, an eight state cooperative exercise responding to a large earthquake along the Mississippi River. As part of the exercise, the 61st MEDCOM trained to triage, treat and transport disaster victims in coordination with other participating entities.

Membership
Any able-bodied citizen with a high school diploma or GED and no criminal record is eligible for membership, although preference is given to honorably discharged members of all five branches from the United States military. Civilians with specific professional skill sets, such as doctors, attorneys, chaplains or engineers, may be given preference for membership without prior military service. All officers must have at minimum earned a bachelor's degree.

Training

New personnel with no prior military service are required to attend Initial Entry Training (IET) during their first year, usually held concurrently with Annual Training (AT). Prospective members are required to take several free online emergency management classes offered by the Federal Emergency Management Agency in order to earn the Military Emergency Management Specialist Badge. Tennessee State Guard training includes classes from the Tennessee Emergency Management Agency (TEMA). The Tennessee State Guard also provides online training courses through the SGAUS PME Academy. Training is conducted during drill days, which are held one day per month, and during an annual three-day drill during the summer.

All of the TNSG basic non-commissioned officer and basic officer courses are approved through the United States Army Training and Doctrine Command at Fort Monroe, Virginia. In 2015, the Tennessee State Guard initiated in-residence courses to include Advanced Leaders Course (ALC), Officer Basic Course (OBC) and Warrant Officer Basic Course (WOBC). These courses are generally conducted once per year concurrently with Annual Training (AT).

In 2010, the Tennessee State Guard launched a four-month military police class, with regiments from East Tennessee taking part in the pilot program taught at the Knoxville Police Headquarters.

Uniforms
The TNSG uses the Army Combat Uniform (ACU) in the UCP pattern as its uniform. In the event that Tennessee State Guardsmen are assigned to work with the Tennessee National Guard as members of a flight crew, Guardsmen are authorized to wear the aircrew battle dress uniform (ABDU) if prescribed by the commander. For formal events, including military funerals and award ceremonies, the Dress Blue or Army Service Uniform (ASU) is optional for Guardsmen.

Organization
The Tennessee State Guard is organized as a Directorate Headquarters with four regiments. The headquarters are in Nashville, Tennessee. Offices and directorates reporting directly to headquarters include:

 Directorate of Personnel Administration
 Directorate of Plans, Operations and Training
 Directorate of Security and Intelligence
 Directorate of Logistics
 Directorate of Civil/Military Support
 Directorate of Communications
 Directorate of Engineering Services
 Directorate of Training, Doctrine and Force Development
 Directorate of Information Services
 Headquarters Commandant
 Headquarters Surgeon Section
 Secretary to the General Staff
 Judge Advocate General Staff
 Office of the Inspector General
 Provost Marshal
 TNSG Academy
 Public Information Office
 Chaplains

The battalions of the TNSG are organized into four larger units: the 1st Tennessee Regiment, based in Millington; the 2nd Brigade Support team, based in Nashville; the 3rd Tennessee Regiment, based in Knoxville; and the 4th Tennessee Regiment, based in Chattanooga.
 The TNSG also includes the 61st Medical Company (MEDCOM) that provides medical command and support.

Legal protection
Like National Guardsmen and federal reservists, state guard members receive protection from termination or other forms of discipline from their employers as a result of being called into active duty or drill status under Tennessee Code Annotated § 8-33-110.

Awards and decorations
In addition to several ribbons issued by the TNSG, Tennessee State Guardsmen are allowed to wear decorations issued by other military institutions, including ribbons, decorations, and badges issued by the following institutions in order of precedence:
 Awards from the seven Uniformed services of the United States, which includes the five branches of the United States Armed Forces (both federal and reserve), the United States Public Health Service, and the National Oceanographic and Atmospheric Administration
 Awards from foreign nations approved for wear by the U.S. Armed Forces
 Awards issued by the Tennessee Army or Air National Guard, or a different state's National Guard
 Tennessee State Guard awards
 Civil Air Patrol awards
 Coast Guard Auxiliary awards
 Awards from other authorized state defense forces (pending approval from the TNSG commanding general)
 Awards from the State Guard Association of the United States

State Guardsmen who have earned the Combat Infantry Badge, the Parachutist Badge, the Ranger tab, the Pilot Wings, the Air Crewman Wings, the Submarine Warfare insignia, the Diver insignia, the SEAL Trident, or other awards or badges while in federal service may wear them on the TNSG uniform as prescribed by the United States Army uniform regulations.

Individual ribbons
The Tennessee State Guard issues the following awards:

  TNSG Valor Ribbon
  TNSG Alvin C. York Ribbon
  TNSG Distinguished Service Ribbon
  TNSG Meritorious Service Ribbon
  TNSG Com. Gen. Letter of Commendation Ribbon
  TNSG Commendation Ribbon
  TNSG Wound Ribbon
  TNSG Life Saving Ribbon
  TNSG Officer Achievement Ribbon
  TNSG Enlisted Achievement Ribbon
  TNSG TN Defense Service Ribbon
  TNSG Search & Rescue Ribbon
  TNSG Aid to Civil Authority Ribbon
  TNSG Operation Desert Storm/Shield Ribbon
  TNSG Operation Enduring Freedom Ribbon
  TNSG Operation Task Force Volunteer Ribbon
  TNSG Community Volunteer Service Ribbon
  TNSG Soldier of the Year Ribbon
  TNSG Good Conduct Ribbon
  TNSG Officer Training
  TNSG NCO Training Ribbon
  TNSG Basic Entry Level Training
  TNSG Chaplain's Ribbon
  TNSG Volunteer Service Ribbon
  TNSG Recruitment Achievement Ribbon
  TNSG Recruiter's Ribbon
  TNSG Military Readiness Ribbon
  TNSG Service Ribbon

See also
 Naval militia
 Tennessee Air National Guard
 Tennessee Wing Civil Air Patrol
 United States Coast Guard Auxiliary

References

External links
 The Tennessee State Guard Website
 History of the Tennessee State Guard during World War II on the Tennessee Virtual Archive

State defense forces of the United States
Military in Tennessee